WRLX (94.3 FM) is a radio station that serves the Port St. Lucie/Stuart/West Palm Beach/Fort Lauderdale/Miami area with a Spanish-language adult contemporary format.  Its studios and transmitter tower are in West Palm Beach (separately). It is under ownership of iHeartMedia, Inc., and shares a building with several other iHeartMedia stations.

History
The station began broadcasting in 1971, and held the call sign WGMW. It aired an easy listening format. In 1979, its call sign was changed to WNJY, and it aired a beautiful music format. In 1982, the station was sold to Lappin Communications for $1.6 million. In 1983, the station adopted an adult standards format, and became an affiliate of Music of Your Life. It was branded "Joy 94".

In September 1988, its call sign was changed to WMXQ and it adopted an adult contemporary format. In November 1989, its call sign was changed to WOLL and it adopted an oldies format. In May 1996, its format was shifted to classic hits. In August 1998, the station adopted a smooth jazz format, and in September its call sign was changed to WWLV. It was part of a simulcast with 93.9 WLVE in Miami Beach.

In January 2003, the station's call sign was changed to WZZR, and it adopted a hot talk format, with the format and call sign moving from 92.7 in Stuart, Florida. It was branded "Real Radio" and was part of a simulcast with WCZR (101.7 FM) in Vero Beach. On June 1, 2020, the station swapped formats and call signs with Spanish-language AC formatted 92.1 FM WRLX.

HD Radio
WRLX is licensed to broadcast in the HD Radio (hybrid) format. As of August 2022 it does not broadcast any subchannels.

References

External links

RLX
Radio stations established in 1971
IHeartMedia radio stations
1971 establishments in Florida
RLX